The Junkers J 1, nicknamed the Blechesel ("Tin Donkey" or "Sheet Metal Donkey"), was an experimental monoplane aircraft developed by Junkers & Co. It was the world's first all-metal aircraft.

Manufactured early on in the First World War, an era in which aircraft designers relied largely on fabric-covered wooden structures braced with wires, the J 1 was a revolutionary development in aircraft design, making extensive use of metal both throughout its structure as had been done previously, and in its outer skins. It originated from the work of pioneering aeronautical designer Hugo Junkers. The experimental aircraft never received an official "A" nor an "E-series" monoplane designation from IdFlieg and the then-designated Fliegertruppe, and was officially known only by its Junkers factory model number of J 1. It should not be confused with the later, armoured all-metal Junkers J 4 sesquiplane, accepted by the later Luftstreitkräfte as the Junkers J.I (using a Roman numeral), from the category of armored combat aircraft established by IdFlieg, the German Army's inspectorate of military aircraft.

The J 1 was constructed and flown only 12 years after the Wright Brothers had first flown the "Flyer I" biplane in December 1903. On 12 December 1915, the aircraft made its brief maiden flight, flown by Leutnant Theodor Mallinckrodt of Flieger-Ersatz-Abteilung 1 (FEA 1), during which an altitude of almost  was reached. Greater altitudes and performance were achieved during subsequent flights. By the end of January 1916, Junkers had been given a contract to further develop his all-metal concept, and the later Junkers J 2 single-seat fighter, which would never see frontline service, was the follow-on to the J 1. It is believed that the Junkers J 1 was not flown again after January 1916. In 1926, it was placed on static display at the Deutsches Museum in Munich. In December 1944, the J 1 was destroyed during an Allied strategic bombing raid on the city.

Development

Background
Amongst the earlier pioneers and innovators in the field of aviation was the German engineer and aeronautical designer Hugo Junkers. During his early career he had established his engineering credentials outside of the field of aviation; Junker's innovations had included the invention of a type of calorimeter and in the construction of internal combustion engines. Sometime after 1897, Junkers was first introduced to the principles and field of aviation after having received details of the concept of heavier-than-air travel from Hans Reissner, a colleague and fellow professor at the Technische Hochschule in Aachen, where Junkers held the chair of Professor of Thermodynamics.

During 1907 Reissner approached Junkers, seeking his collaboration in the design and construction of an early monoplane aircraft; although this first effort, which flew in 1909, did not meet with much success, it was this project which has been credited with leading to Junkers pursuing a career as an aeronautical designer. Five years later Reissner, with Junkers' help, began construction of his all-metal canard design, which he named the Ente ("Duck"). Junkers' firm manufactured portions of Reissner's design, including the flying surfaces and radiator. The problems encountered in constructing the Ente had led to Junkers spending considerable amounts of time working on the problems of airframe design, including an examination of the options for the elimination of the then-prevalent practice of exterior bracing of airframes. During 1910 he patented the design for a fully cantilevered thick aerofoil tailless aircraft, now commonly known as a flying wing configuration, in Germany.

During 1910 Junkers received a research grant for the construction of a wind tunnel at his research facilities in Aachen; this led to the initiation of an aerodynamic research programme that would, five years later, contribute to the design of the Junkers J 1. In 1911, Junkers resigned his professorship in order to dedicate his efforts to his Dessau-based engine company; he returned to Aachen upon the completion of the wind tunnel. It was not until 1915 that Junkers was able to fully devote his time to the design and manufacture of an aircraft; it was at this point that he opened his own research institute, the Forschungsanstalt Professor Junkers, which was assigned responsibility for the design and development of a series of fully cantilevered all-metal monoplanes.

Upon the outbreak of the First World War in August 1914, Junkers decided to direct his efforts towards projects which would have potential military value. During this era, the majority of aircraft designers were relatively conservative and, save for some isolated examples, no advancements were achieved; according to aviation historian Charles Gibbs-Smith, the pioneering work of Hugo Junkers was a notable exception. It was Junkers' efforts, along with those of collaborators such as engineers Otto Reuter, Otto Mader, head of Junkers' Forschungsanstalt; and Hans Steudel, director of Junkers' structural materials and testing department that the J 1 would be produced as a private venture, in the form of what would nowadays be termed a "technology demonstrator" design.

Concept and contract
Irrespective of the outbreak of the conflict, Junkers and his company's research institute, or Forschungsanstalt, commenced engineering work to realize his concept for the creation of aircraft designs that would dispense with drag-producing exterior bracing. His work on Reissner's Ente design had convinced him of the necessity to use metal as the main structural material, but since the apparently ideal metal alloy for aircraft construction – duralumin, which had been invented by Alfred Wilm only some six years earlier in Germany, and was initially prone to flaking and other undesirable characteristics when worked in sheet metal form; the initial all-metal aircraft designs produced by Junkers made use of sheets of heavier electrical steel, similar to the types of ferrous sheet metals that are typically used in laminated-core AC electrical transformers.

On 8 June 1915, Junkers began to acquire the tooling necessary to produce the J 1. According to aviation author Hugh Cowin, while it has often mis-reported as having been produced to a specific specification as an aircraft intended for active military service, the J 1 was instead intended to be produced purely as a research aircraft, close to what today would be called a "technology demonstrator", that would subsequently led to the production of a later line of all-metal monoplane fighter aircraft. By November 1915, the completed J 1 was considered to be ready to conduct its initial round of flight testing.

Design
The Junkers J 1 was an experimental mid-wing monoplane that incorporated various modern features, having a cantilever wing and an entirely metal structure elements. Externally, the J 1 was an exceptionally clean and well-proportioned aircraft. This arrangement was the first use of an all-metal stressed-skin construction. The single vertical tail surface was of an "all-flying" design, with no fixed fin, and the entire tail surface structure and covering also consisted of formed sheet steel, much like the wings. The angle of incidence of the stabilizer could be adjusted on the ground.

The basic structure of the J 1 was built up around its center fuselage section and the integral inboard stub wing, functioning as the aircraft's wing roots. The stub wings served as attachment points for Junkers' patented sparless wings, which consisted of short span truss-tires sections successively layered outwards from the stub wings. Other elements fixed onto the centre section include the nose section, rear fuselage, and tail unit. Atypically for the era, the wing lacked any exterior bracing struts or wires; the only use of external bracing was for support of the horizontal stabilisers and the undercarriage. The internal structure made use of welded strip-steel angle stock and I-beam sections in conjunction with portions of steel tubing to form its main internal structure.

The innovative cantilever structure for the wings were also covered in chordwise sheet steel panels. The wing root had a depth of about 75 per cent of the height of the fuselage at the root's thickest point, and the wing had at least three airfoil changes, along with tapering of the leading and trailing edge angles between the wing's root and the wingtip. These changes in wing section would become a Junkers design hallmark on the later 1918 Junkers D.I. single-seat all-metal fighter design, which was covered with Wilm's duralumin, corrugated as first attempted with the Junkers J 3 airframe exercise of 1916–17. The J 1 also relied on steel panels with span-wise corrugations as a structural element hidden under the smooth outer metal covering to increase the wing's strength. This particular design element of the J 1 was used on a wider number of later-built all-metal aircraft, such as for the wings of the American Boeing B-17 Flying Fortress heavy bomber.

The  Mercedes D.II six-cylinder liquid-cooled inline engine selected to power the J-1 was housed within a simple, clamshell-like horizontally split cowling enclosing the engine's crankcase and lower cylinder block. It featured an advanced engine radiator layout for the era, having placed the radiator in a ventral position underneath the forward fuselage; the front of the radiator housing's opening was located just behind the front gear strut's attachment points to the fuselage, and with the radiator's housing having a width equal to that of the fuselage above it.

Operational history

Flight test programme
Before the Junkers J 1 could fly for the first time, IdFlieg, the Inspektorat der Fliegertruppen, the aviation administration arm of the German Army, required that static load tests be performed on the J 1. This involved the usual static loading trials being carried out on the J 1's structure using sandbags, loading and strength tests, as well as a test of the static thrust that would be obtained with the chosen engine and propeller combination. On 3 December 1915, these static tests were completed, preceding a series of engine thrust tests. The Junkers factory did not yet possess its own test field in Dessau, so the completed J 1 was transported to the Fliegerersatzabteilung 1 (FEA 1) airfield in Döberitz, just west of Berlin, for its flight testing program.

On 12 December 1915, Leutnant Theodor Mallinckrodt of FEA 1 was assigned to taxi and briefly "hop" the J 1, which he managed to do successfully up to almost a  altitude. However, during the course of this small flight, a gust of wind caught the starboard wing during the "hop" as the J 1 descended, resulting in the port wingtip scraping the ground and the portside of the J 1's fuselage was correspondingly bent inwards towards the rear of the wing mount. Accordingly, further tests were put on hold while repairs were made through the holiday period at the end of 1915, after which a further round of static load tests were carried out to validate the integrity of these repairs.

On 18 January 1916, the second attempt at achieving flight for the J 1 was carried out at Döberitz by Gefreiter (Private) Paul Arnold of the FEA 1 unit. During this flight, the J 1 attained an altitude of only , following a  takeoff run, as the variable incidence stabilizer had been incorrectly set in the mistaken belief that the J 1 was tail-heavy. In this instances, the inflight handling of the J 1 was determined to be acceptable and the aircraft was reportedly stable during flight.

During this flight, Mallinckrodt was recorded as having managed to attain a top speed of 170 km/h (106 mph). As a consequence of military interest in Junkers' design, the J 1 was compared to the popular Rumpler C.I two-seat armed observation biplane during its flight test programme. Testing determined the J 1 to be some  slower in its top speed, even though the Rumpler biplane was powered by the more powerful Mercedes D.III engine; however, due to the lighter weight of the Rumpler's wood-and-fabric airframe, it was capable of a much greater rate of climb rate than the J 1, handicapped by its experimental steel structure.

Conclusions and follow-on
In addition to its flight performance, other aspects of the J 1 were evaluated during the test programme. Feedback was gathered not only from the pilots but also the ground crew that serviced it; allegedly, the welded construction of the aircraft presented several issues on the ground that have never before been encountered. In conjunction with its sluggish performance in the air, some individuals mocked the J 1 with derogatory names, the most prominent of these being the Blechesel ("Tin Donkey" or "Sheet Metal Donkey"). However, some figures, such as Dutch aviation pioneer Anthony Fokker, praised the potential of the aircraft and the principles demonstrated, pointing to the applications of the higher speed and greater durability of prospective aircraft that would apply such a construction.

The handling of the J 1 was the subject of derision by Junkers' critics: however, the military remained supportive of further refinement of the concept. Accordingly, by the end of January 1916, Junkers had been given a contract to further develop his all-metal concept, and the later Junkers J 2 single-seat fighter, which would never see frontline service, was the follow-on to the J 1. The J 2 would only bear a superficial similarity to the J 1, being more aerodynamically refined and slightly smaller in scale, yet nonetheless the two aircraft shared an essentially similar structure.

Preservation and recreations
It is believed that the Junkers J 1 was not flown again after January 1916. However, it survived the First World War, and was placed on static display in 1926 at the Deutsches Museum in Munich. During December 1944, the J 1 was destroyed during an Allied bombing raid on the city during the Second World War. As such, there are no surviving examples of the J 1.

A metal scale display model of the J 1 was built by a group of Junkers' factory workers following its initial flights, and was publicly exhibited at the Franklin Institute in Philadelphia, Pennsylvania, following the First World War. Its fate after this is not known.

During 2015, the Junkers Technology Museum in Dessau, Germany, announced that they intended to construct a full-scale replica of the pioneering J 1. To fund this ambition, financing was sought through a crowdfunding campaign on Kickstarter.

Specifications

References

Citations

Bibliography
 Cowin, Hugh. "Aircraft Profile No. 187: The Junkers Monoplanes." Profile Publications Ltd, 1967. No ISBN. 
 Grosz, Peter and Gerard Terry. "The Way to the World's First All-Metal Fighter", Air Enthusiast Twenty-Five, 1984, pp. 60–63. ISSN 0143-5450.
 Wagner, Ray and Heinz Nowarra. German Combat Planes: A Comprehensive Survey and History of the Development of German Military Aircraft from 1914 to 1945. New York: Doubleday, 1971.

External links
 
 Junkers J 1 in Döberitz, 1915
 The J 1 Projekt, homepage for a reproduction of the J 1 being built in Germany
 The Hugo Junkers Homepage - Junkers J 1 info page
 Official Junkers site's page on the Junkers J 1 (in German)

1910s German experimental aircraft
J 001
Aircraft first flown in 1915
Single-engined tractor aircraft